Michael F. Crommie (born December 1961) is an American physicist, a professor of physics at the University of California, Berkeley. World-renowned for his research on condensed-matter physics, he is a recipient of both the Newcomb-Cleveland Prize and the Davisson–Germer Prize in Atomic Physics. Crommie currently directs the Crommie Research Group.

Education
Crommie completed his undergraduate studies at the University of California, Los Angeles, earning a bachelor's degree in 1984.  He completed his doctoral studies under Alex Zettl at UC Berkeley, receiving a Ph.D. in 1991, and was a postdoctoral fellow at IBM under Don Eigler. In 2007 he was elected as a fellow of the American Physical Society.

Research
Crommie's research group currently uses scanning tunneling microscopy and scanning tunneling spectroscopy.  Crommie is known for demonstrating the quantum corral in 1993 with Lutz and Eigler by using an elliptical ring of cobalt atoms on a copper surface. The ferromagnetic cobalt atoms reflected the surface electrons of the copper inside the ring into a wave pattern, as predicted by the theory of quantum mechanics.

See also 
 Quantum mirage

References

External links 
 The Crommie Research Group at UC Berkeley

Living people
21st-century American physicists
University of California, Los Angeles alumni
University of California, Berkeley alumni
University of California, Berkeley College of Letters and Science faculty
1961 births